The Bloody Falls massacre was an incident believed to have taken place during Hudson Bay Company employee Samuel Hearne's exploration of the Coppermine River for copper deposits near modern-day Kugluktuk, Nunavut, Canada on 17 July 1771. Hearne's original travelogue is now lost, and the narrative that became the famous story was published after Hearne's death with substantial editorializing.

Prelude 
Towards the end of May 1771, Samuel Hearne began to notice that the Chipewyan Indians accompanying him on his expedition had motives other than his planned survey of the Coppermine River. On the party's arrival at Peshew Lake, Matonabbee and a number of the men accompanying Hearne began to make arrangements for their wives and children to be left behind. Hearne noted that his party was joined by a number of Indians who were solely interested in propagating a war against the Inuit. In the travel narrative describing his journey, he claimed that, as the group advanced north into Inuit territories, it became evident that his companions were gradually plotting an act of "savage", "shocking", and "brutish" violence. The Dene people of the area claim, however, that Hearne himself was not present at the event, while Hearne's contemporaries further questioned his claims. The oral history of the Inuit-Dene conflict also does not reflect the Bloody Falls story.

Hearne began to remonstrate with his guides but failed in his attempt. He wrote of the events, "I endeavored as much as possible to persuade them from putting their inhuman design into execution; but so far were my intreaties from having the wished-for effect, that it was concluded that I was actuated by cowardice." On 1 June 1771, the few remaining women and children were left behind by the party, as well as the dogs and the heavy luggage, and a group of about 60 men advanced north towards the Coppermine River. On 2 July 1771, the party came across a group of Copper Indians, who learned the purpose of the exploration party's journey and supplied them with canoes and other necessities. However, 17 men abandoned the exploration party in the coming days, claiming that the difficulty of the trek outweighed the pleasure that was to be derived from killing the Inuit.

The remaining members of the exploration party arrived at the Coppermine River on 14 July 1771. Three scouts were sent to locate any Inuit who might have been camping near the river, as Hearne commenced his survey. The scouts returned on 16 July 1771 and reported that five Inuit tents had been found on the west side of the river. This news brought the survey work to a complete halt, and the men began to prepare for war.

Massacre 

Just after midnight on 17 July, the Dene set upon the Inuit camp and killed approximately 20 men, women and children. Hearne was traumatized by the massacre, saying "I am confident that my features must have feelingly expressed how sincerely I was affected at the barbarous scene I then witnessed; even at this hour I cannot reflect on the transactions of that horrid day without shedding tears." He claims to have named the waterfall Bloody Falls.

Legacy 

The site of the massacre, which was the traditional home of the Kogluktogmiut, is now located in Kugluk/Bloody Falls Territorial Park near Kugluktuk, Nunavut. It was designated a National Historic Site in 1978, however its designation as a historical site was not due to it being the site of the purported massacre, rather due to it being a  "traditional fishing site, also containing small caribou hunting stations, that record the presence of Pre-Dorset, Thule, First Nation and Inuit cultures over the past three millennia."

The incident is referred to in the John Newlove poem Samuel Hearne in Wintertime.

See also
List of massacres in Canada

References

External links
Youth Links – The Story of Bloody Falls Short article written by three Kugluktuk students.
Samuel Hearnes' Journey from Prince of Wales Fort in Hudson's Bay to the Northern Ocean – Login Required
The Canadian Encyclopedia: Bloody Falls

Conflicts in 1771
Massacres in 1771
Kitikmeot Region
Inuit history
First Nations history
History of the Arctic
Massacres by First Nations
1771 in North America 
1771 murders in North America
18th century in Canada
Indigenous conflicts in Canada
18th century in the Arctic
1771 in Canada
Dene
Copper Inuit